Dževad Karahasan (born 25 January 1953) is a Bosnian writer, essayist and philosopher. Karahasan was awarded with Herder Prize and Goethe Medal for his writings.

In 2020, the city of Frankfurt awarded him the Goethe Prize.

Early life
Karahasan was born in Tomislavgrad into a Bosnian Muslim family. He described his father as a "religious communist" and mother as a devoted Muslim. He himself often spent time with Franciscan friars in the local monastery.

Education
He studied literature and theatre at the University of Sarajevo. He received his Ph.D. from the Faculty of Philosophy at the University of Zagreb.

Life
In 1993 Karahasan fled the war in Sarajevo, a city that plays a central role in his work. From 1986 to 1993, Karahasan was a lecturer in drama and drama theory and the dean of the Academy for Performing Arts at the University of Sarajevo, since 1993 he has been a guest lecturer at various European universities, including Salzburg, Berlin and Göttingen.

Works

Theatre
Since 1993 Karahasan works as a dramatist for ARBOS – Company for Music and Theatre. His plays have been performed in Austria (Vienna, Krems, Hallein, Eisenstadt, Salzburg, Villach, Klagenfurt), Germany (Gera, Erfurt, Berlin, Leipzig), Bosnia-Herzegovina (Sarajevo), Ukraine (Odessa), Czech Republic (Prague, Hradec Králové, Brno), Kosovo (Pristina), Poland (Szczecin), Singapore (Singapore Arts Festival) and USA (Washington DC).

Literature and essays
In addition to his dramas and novel Karahasan published numerous essays in various European newspapers.

Prizes
Charles Veillon European Essay Prize (1994)
Bruno Kreisky Prize for Political Books (1995) 
Herder Prize (1999)
Leipzig Book Award for European Understanding (2004)
Vilenica Prize (2010)
Goethe Medal (2012) 
Goethe Prize (2020)

Publications

Novels and essays
 "The Eastern Divan", 1993 
 "Sarajevo, Exodus of a City," 1993 
 "About the exile in the open society" 1994
 "King's legends," 1996 
 "Citizen Handke, Serbs people" in "The anxiety of the poet from reality," 1996 
 "Should 'Faust' be saved?" in "Freedom.Equality.Fraternity." Bregenzer Festspiele 1996
 "The Shahriyar's Ring" 1997 
 "Forms of life" (about theatre together with Herbert Gantschacher) 1999 
 "The questions to the calendar" 1999 
 "Sara and Serafina" 2000 
 "The book of Gardens" 2002
 "Poetics at the Border" (together with Markus Jaroschka) 2003 
 "The Night Council" 2006 
 "Reports from The Dark World" 2007 
 "The Shadows of The Cities" 2010 
 "The Solace of the Night Sky" 2015

Theatre
 "The Wheel of St. Catherine," National Theatre Sarajevo 1990
 Abdullah Ibn al-Muqaffa" Theatre Akzent Vienna by ARBOS – Company for Music and Theatre 1994
 "The Song of Fools of Europe" Literary installation of a libretto, together with Herbert Gantschacher, Künstlerhaus Salzburg by ARBOS – Company for Music and Theatre 1994
 "Povuceni Andjeo" Danube Festival in Krems by ARBOS - Company for Music and Theatre 1995
 "The Concert of Birds" Künstlerhaus Salzburg by ARBOS – Company for Music and Theatre 1997 
 "The Atlas of Feelings" Frankfurt/Oder 1999
 "Woyzeck" adopted from the fragment of Georg Büchner, National Theatre Sarajevo 1999
 "Babylon or The Trip of The Beautiful Jutte" European Cultural Centre Erfurt by ARBOS – Company for Music and Theatre 1999
 "The Strangers" ARBOS – Company for Music and Theatre Vienna 2001
 "UROBOS: Project Time" together with Herbert Gantschacher, Singapore Arts Festival by ARBOS – Company for Music and Theater 2001
 "Snow and death" (adopted by Herbert Gantschacher) ARBOS – Company for Music and Theatre 2002
 "On the edge of the desert" neuebuehnevillach by ARBOS – Company for Music and Theatre 2003
 "An old Oriental Fable" ARBOS – Company for Music and Theatre 2004
 "The Death of Empedocles" adopted from the fragment of Friedrich Hölderlin together with Herbert Gantschacher, ARBOS – Company for Music and Theatre 2005
 "The One and The Other" ARBOS – Company for Music and Theatre 2005
 "Banquet" neuebuehnevillach by ARBOS – Company for Music and Theatre 2005 
 "The Maps of The Shadows" ARBOS – Companpy for Music and Theatre 2009
 "Principle Gabriel" ARBOS – Company for Music and Theatre 2014

Radiodrama
 "AL-Mukaffa" ORF Vienna 1994
 "The Delighted Angel" ORF Vienna 1995

Audio CDs
 "Al-Mukaffa" ARBOS 1996
 "The Singing of The Fools of Europe" ORF ARBOS 1998
 "UROBOS : Project Time" Singapore Arts Festival 2001
 "Banquet" Tonstudio Weikert ARBOS 2006

References

1953 births
Living people
People from Tomislavgrad
Bosniaks of Bosnia and Herzegovina
Bosnia and Herzegovina writers
Bosnia and Herzegovina poets
Bosniak writers
Faculty of Humanities and Social Sciences, University of Zagreb alumni
Herder Prize recipients